John Foster Dulles High School, more commonly known as Dulles High School, is a high school in Sugar Land, Texas.  It was the first site purchase and new build, in the 1950s, of the newly formed Fort Bend Independent School District, which held its first graduation in 1960.  The first class to graduate from Dulles itself was 1962. Its mascot is the Viking, and its team colors are red, white and blue. Its slogan was "Set Sail" up until the end of the 2018–2019 school year, but was changed to "Viking True" the next school year.

At its highest, the school roll was over 4,000 students during the 1976–1977 school year. During the 2006–2007 school year, the roll comprised 2,291. The school serves children from parts of Sugar Land, Missouri City and the city of Meadows Place as well as portions of the extraterritorial jurisdiction (ETJ) of Stafford. Dulles serves a portion of the First Colony community. In previous eras, Dulles served the Four Corners community, and it served most of (the Fort Bend County portion of) the City of Stafford until the city broke away from FBISD in 1977.

 the principal is Corey Stewart, a former United States Marine

Dulles was named a National Blue Ribbon School in 1984–85.

History

Circa the 1950s, the Kempner brothers rejected the idea of a new Sugar Land high school being named after them because they believed that students would prefer to have their school named after figures from previous wars who won honors and/or athletes; this was despite the fact that officials from the Texas educational agency had approved the naming, initially proposed by Sugar Land citizens. It is named after the eponymous John Foster Dulles, the American Secretary of State and diplomat who died the year the high school opened.

Dulles formed in 1959 from a merger of Missouri City High School and Sugar Land High School. Dulles was classified by the University Interscholastic League school as a "Class B" school until 1972 when it became classified as a 4A school, then the largest classification in the state. From its opening, Dulles was the only zoned high school in the district for whites, and after desegregation, the only zoned high school for all students until Willowridge High School opened in 1979. FBISD racially desegregated in 1965; before that year, black high school students attended M.R. Wood School in Sugar Land which was converted into a school for  disobedient children.

Principals 

 James Patterson was principal of Dulles from 1984 through 1991.
 Mark Foust was principal of Dulles until 2013. 
 In 2013, Ronnie Edwards became the school's principal. 
 In 2016, Dr. Jennifer Nichols, a Dulles High School graduate and prior teacher, became School Principal.
 In 2019, Mrs. Melissa King-Knowles became the school's principal.
In 2021, Mr. Corey Stewart became the school's principal.

Academics
Dulles is home to the Math and Science Academy, which provides students with even more options to extend their studies in these areas. Dulles is one of the only schools in the state to offer Chem III or Organic Chemistry. Starting with the 2013–2014 school year, Biotechnology (Biology III) is offered as an honors course. Modern Physics (Physics III) has been added to the math and science curriculum as well. Calculus III, or multivariable calculus, is offered to students who have finished Calculus BC before their senior year. Other classes include Chem II, Bio II, and Physics II C. Dulles offers a total of 24 AP courses. Scientific Research and Design is an honors class offered in which students work with mentors to write papers and develop projects, and some of these projects will be submitted to prestigious competitions such as Siemens or ISEF. Students take the class to fulfill the research requirement of the academy.

Campus
Louis P. Rodgers Memorial Auditorium in Dulles High School was built in 1969. Its namesake was FBISD's first superintendent.

Other notable clubs

Academic Decathlon

Dulles was the 2017, 2018, 2020, 2021 6A Texas Academic Decathlon State Champion. In 1987, 2019, and 2022, it was also the Texas Academic Decathlon Overall State Champion. It achieved the record for highest team score in Texas history in 2019.

Academic Decathlon State Championship Titles
 2022 - Overall State Champion 
 2021 - Large School State Champion, 3rd Overall
 2020 - Large School State Champion, 2nd Overall
 2019 - USAD Nationals 3rd Place
 2019 - Overall State Champion
 2018 - Large School State Champion, 2nd Overall
 2017 - USAD Nationals 2nd Place (E-Nats)
 2017 - Large School State Champion, 2nd Overall
 1987 - Overall State Champion

Speech and Debate Team
2012 - UIL Cross-Examination Debate State Champions (Faraz Hemani and Humza Tariq)
 2011 - UIL Cross-Examination Debate State Champions (Faraz Hemani and Usamah Andrabi)
 2010 - UIL Cross-Examination Debate State Champions (Faraz Hemani and Kevin Clarke)
 2009 - UIL Cross-Examination Debate State Champions (Shikhar Singh and Kevin Clarke)
 2006 - NFL Lincoln Douglas Debate National Champion (Douglas Jeffers)
In 2013 32 students received national merit scholarships from the Math and Science sector of the school.

National Science Bowl

2012, 2013, 2014, 2015, 2017, 2018, 2019, 2020, 2021, 2022 Texas A&M Regional Science Bowl Champions

2019 National Science Bowl Runner-Ups (Second Place)

Science Bowl was founded in 2012 at Dulles High School, and the organization has achieved prolific success at the regional competition, winning in every year except 2016. At the national competition, Dulles High School has reached the top 16 seven times.

Athletics
Dulles athletics are included in UIL District 20-6A division. Other members include FB Austin, FB Bush, FB Clements, FB Ridge Point, FB Hightower, FB Kempner, and FB Travis.

Boys Athletics
 Baseball
 Basketball
 Cross Country
 Football
 Golf
 Soccer
 Swimming/Diving
 Tennis
 Track/Field
Girls Athletics
 Basketball
 Cheer
 Cross Country
 Golf
 Soccer
 Softball
 Swimming/Diving
 Tennis
 Track/Field
 Volleyball

AFJROTC
The JROTC unit at Dulles is an Air Force JROTC program.  Its designation is TX-862, signifying that it was the second Air Force JROTC program created in Texas in 1986.

It won its last major award in 2006. The color guard has won 1st at its last 4 region-wide competitions, the last one being at the FBISD drill competition in 2019. The drill team has won at its last 2 region-wide competitions.

As a unit, TX-862 achieved its first Meritorious Unit award in 1988, and continued to earn this distinction from 1988 - 1992.  In 1993, it achieved its first Honor Unit award, and earned this distinction through at least 1997.

The TX-862 Unit had eventually received their first Distinguished Unit Award with Merit in their unit lifetime on April 23, 2011.

Other information

Notable alumni
 Paul Begala (Class of 1979), Democratic political consultant for Bill Clinton's successful 1992 United States presidential campaign and a current political pundit for CNN
 Roger Clemens (Class of 1979), Former Houston Astros, New York Yankees, Toronto Blue Jays, and Boston Red Sox pitcher and winner of seven Cy Young Awards (attended during the sophomore year before transferring to Spring Woods High School)
 Greg Davidson (Class of 1976), Former professional football player who played at North Texas and later for the Houston Oilers and Houston Gamblers
 Sarah Davis (Class of 1994), Attorney, State Representative (R-West University Place, Texas; 2011 to present) 
 Billy Stritch (Class of 1979), notable jazz singer and pianist
 Kevin Eschenfelder (Class of 1983), sportscaster and studio host, FSN Southwest
 Sean Patrick Flanery (Class of 1984), American film actor
 Kelsey Bone (Class of 2009), Professional basketball player for the Connecticut Sun in the WNBA
 Billy Ray Brown (Class of 1981), Professional Golfer
 Rhea Walls (Class of 2013),  Stellar Award-winning Gospel recording Artist
 Alic Walls (Class of 2014),  Stellar Award-winning Gospel recording Artist
 Ahjah Walls (Class of 2015), Stellar Award-winning Gospel recording
 Ainias Smith (Class of 2019), Notable player for the Texas A&M Aggies Football Team

Feeder patterns
The following elementary schools feed into Dulles H.S.:
 Dulles
 Barrington Place (partial)
 Highlands
 Lexington Creek
 Meadows

The following middle schools feed into Dulles H.S.:
 Dulles

Notoriety

Cyber-bullying
Dulles, along with the other Fort Bend High Schools of Elkins and Clements, was subject to an act of cyber terrorism when a list titled Whimsical Girls of FBISD was posted on Facebook in April 2010. The list named several female students from the three high schools with graphic detail of promiscuous acts that the girls performed, locations of the acts, as well as severe name calling. While some described this as tattle-taling, others argued that the list was a direct form of verbal assault and demanded the expulsion of the offender who posted the list.

References

External links

 Dulles High School
 Dulles Math and Science Academy
 Dulles Math and Science Academy Booster Club Site
 Unofficial alumni site for Dulles High School
 Official Dulles Athletic Booster Club Site

Fort Bend Independent School District high schools
Schools in Sugar Land, Texas
1959 establishments in Texas
Educational institutions established in 1959